Theria rupicapraria is a moth of the family Geometridae. It is found throughout in Europe and the South Caucasus.

The wingspan is 28–30 mm for males. Females have reduced wings. Adults are on wing from January to April. There is one generation per year.

The larvae feed on Crataegus and Prunus spinosa. Larvae can be found in June. It overwinters as a pupa.

Subspecies
Theria rupicapraria rupicapraria
Theria rupicapraria culminaria Leraut, 1993

External links

Fauna Europaea
BioLib

Ennominae
Moths of Europe
Moths of Asia
Taxa named by Michael Denis
Taxa named by Ignaz Schiffermüller